Stephen Roger Emery (born 7 February 1956) is an English former footballer who played for 13 seasons in the Football League. He spent much of his career at Hereford United, where he made 333 competitive appearances, and also played League football for Derby County and Wrexham.

He was a versatile midfield player and started his career at Hereford when he became the club's first apprentice professional, signing just before his 18th birthday. Initially he spent seven seasons at Edgar Street and was a first team regular as Hereford rose to the Second Division and during their decline back down to the Fourth. In 1979, he was sold to Derby County for £100,000, making the step up to the First Division.

After three seasons, and a brief spell at Newport County, he returned to Hereford in 1983 before moving to Wrexham. He finished his career in non-league football with Gloucester City and Westfields, where he was player-manager while also working in the licensed trade. He also managed Ledbury Town for nearly five years, and returned as manager in late 2008, but was dismissed after only three months.

His son Josh Emery had a spell playing for Hereford.

References

1956 births
Living people
People from Ledbury
Sportspeople from Herefordshire
English footballers
Association football midfielders
Hereford United F.C. players
Derby County F.C. players
Newport County A.F.C. players
Wrexham A.F.C. players
Gloucester City A.F.C. players
English Football League players
English football managers
Westfields F.C. players